Highland is an unincorporated community in Ritchie County, West Virginia, United States.

The community was named after the Scottish Highlands, the ancestral home of a large share of the first settlers.

References

Unincorporated communities in Ritchie County, West Virginia
Unincorporated communities in West Virginia